Miloslav Szabó is a Slovak historian who is employed by the Faculty of Arts of Comenius University in Bratislava.

Works

References

Living people
Writers on antisemitism
Historians of Slovakia
Year of birth missing (living people)
Academic staff of Comenius University